Jim Ronny Andersen (born 4 May 1975) is a Norwegian badminton player. He is the bronze medalists at the 2011 and 2015 World Senior Championships in the men's singles 35+ event.

Career 
Andersen played badminton at the 2004 Summer Olympics in men's singles, defeating Pedro Yang of Guatemala in the first round. In the round of 16, Andersen was defeated by Soni Dwi Kuncoro of Indonesia. In his home country he won 16 titles at the Norwegian National Championships.

Achievements

World Senior Championships

IBF International 
Men's singles

References

External links 
 

1975 births
Living people
People from Vest-Agder
Norwegian male badminton players
Badminton players at the 2004 Summer Olympics
Olympic badminton players of Norway
Sportspeople from Agder